Josie Township is one of thirty-seven townships in Holt County, Nebraska, United States. The population was 19 at the 2020 census. A 2021 estimate placed the township's population at 19.

See also
County government in Nebraska

References

External links
City-Data.com

Townships in Holt County, Nebraska
Townships in Nebraska